The 1995–96 NBA season was the 26th season for the Portland Trail Blazers in the National Basketball Association. After spending their first 25 years at the Memorial Coliseum, the Blazers began playing at the new Rose Garden Arena this season. The team received the eighth pick in the 1995 NBA draft from the Detroit Pistons, and selected Shawn Respert out of Michigan State, but soon traded him to the Milwaukee Bucks in exchange for top draft pick Gary Trent. Rookie center Arvydas Sabonis from Lithuania, who was drafted 24th overall by the Blazers in the 1986 NBA draft, would finally make his debut in the NBA. The Blazers held a 24–24 record at the All-Star break, and struggled playing below .500 afterwards, posting a 26–34 record as of March 5. However, they would win 18 of their final 22 games to finish the season with a 44–38 record. Fourth in the Pacific Division and sixth in the Western Conference, making their 14th straight trip to the postseason and 19th in 20 years.

Clifford Robinson averaged 21.1 points and 5.7 rebounds per game, while Rod Strickland averaged 18.7 points, 9.6 assists and 1.4 steals per game, and Sabonis provided the team with 14.5 points and 8.1 rebounds per game, and was named to the NBA All-Rookie First Team. In addition, second-year guard Aaron McKie contributed 10.7 points per game, while Harvey Grant provided with 9.3 points and 4.8 rebounds per game. Off the bench, James Robinson contributed 8.5 points per game, and Trent provided with 7.5 points and 3.4 rebounds per game. On the defensive side, Buck Williams averaged 7.3 points and 5.8 rebounds per game off the bench, and Chris Dudley contributed 5.1 points, and led the team with 9.0 rebounds and 1.3 blocks per game. Sabonis also finished in second place in both Rookie of the Year, and Sixth Man of the Year voting.

In the playoffs, the Blazers were knocked out in the Western Conference First Round again, losing to the Utah Jazz in five games, suffering a 38-point margin in a 102–64 road loss in Game 5.

Following the season, Strickland, who feuded with head coach P.J. Carlesimo during the season, was traded along with Grant to the Washington Bullets, whom Grant used to play for, while Williams signed as a free agent with the New York Knicks, and Robinson was traded to the Minnesota Timberwolves.

Draft picks

Roster

Roster Notes
 Power forward Bill Curley missed the entire season due to an ankle injury, and never played for the Trail Blazers.

Regular season

Season standings

z – clinched division title
y – clinched division title
x – clinched playoff spot

Record vs. opponents

Game log

Playoffs

| home_wins = 2
| home_losses = 0
| road_wins = 0
| road_losses = 3
}}
|- align="center" bgcolor="#ffcccc"
| 1
| April 25
| @ Utah
| L 102–110
| Rod Strickland (27)
| Chris Dudley (10)
| Rod Strickland (12)
| Delta Center19,614
| 0–1
|- align="center" bgcolor="#ffcccc"
| 2
| April 27
| @ Utah
| L 90–105
| Arvydas Sabonis (26)
| Arvydas Sabonis (12)
| Rod Strickland (7)
| Delta Center19,911
| 0–2
|- align="center" bgcolor="#ccffcc"
| 3
| April 29
| Utah
| W 94–91 (OT)
| Arvydas Sabonis (27)
| Arvydas Sabonis (12)
| Rod Strickland (8)
| Rose Garden21,401
| 1–2
|- align="center" bgcolor="#ccffcc"
| 4
| May 1
| Utah
| W 98–90
| Rod Strickland (27)
| Arvydas Sabonis (13)
| Rod Strickland (7)
| Rose Garden21,401
| 2–2
|- align="center" bgcolor="#ffcccc"
| 5
| May 5
| @ Utah
| L 64–102
| Arvydas Sabonis (14)
| Arvydas Sabonis (8)
| Rod Strickland (8)
| Delta Center19,682
| 2–3
|-

Player statistics

NOTE: Please write the players statistics in alphabetical order by last name.

Season

Playoffs

Awards and honors
 Arvydas Sabonis, All-NBA Rookie First Team

Transactions

References

Portland Trail Blazers seasons
Portland Trail Blazers 1995
Portland Trail Blazers 1996
Port
Port
Port